Beornstan the Archdeacon, also known as Byrnstan, was a medieval Catholic saint from Kent in Anglo-Saxon England.

Very little is known of the life of this saint and he is known to history mainly through the hagiography of the Secgan Manuscript and also The Catalogus Sanctorum in Anglia Pausantium. He was Kentish, an archdeacon and was buried at St Augustine's Abbey so he was probably associated with the early Abbey.

References

Christian saints in unknown century
Medieval English saints
Year of birth unknown